Narla Tata Rao (4 September 1917 – 7 April 2007) was a prominent person in the power sector of India and a former chairman of the Andhra Pradesh State Electricity Board.

Personal 

Tata Rao was born on 4 September 1917 in Kowtharam in Krishna district. After early education in Andhra, he graduated in engineering from Banares Hindu University in 1941 and obtained MS in power systems engineering from the Illinois Institute of Technology in Chicago, IL.

Tata Rao built the Madhya Pradesh State Electricity Board from scratch in 1958. The late K.L. Rao appointed him as Member (Thermal) of the Central Water and Power Commission (CWPC) in 1972. However, Jalagam Vengala Rao spared no efforts to get Tata Rao to the State in August 1974. Tata Rao became synonymous with the energy sector in Andhra Pradesh. He increased the installed capacity of the State grid five-fold by conceiving giant generation projects like Vijayawada Thermal Station, Nagarjunasagar, Srisailam and Lower Sileru.

He formed a strong base for the State's electricity sector, which is now considered one of the best in the country. He won several awards at national and international levels, including Padma Shri(1983).

Former Positions
 Chairman Andhra Pradesh State Electricity Board (1974–88)
 Member (Thermal) Central water & Power Commission (1972–74) 
 Vice Chairman, Madhya Pradesh Electricity Board 
 Chairman, Committee on Super Thermal Stations. Govt. of India
 Chairman, Energy Research Committee of CSIR,  Govt. of India  
 Consultant, Asian Development Bank – Reorganisation Bangladesh Power Development Board
 Member, Rajadhyaksha Committee on Power Govt. of India   
 Chairman, Expert Group on Development of Power Technology in the Future Planning Commission Govt. of India 
 Member, Atomic Power Authority. Govt. of India
 Member, Energy Policy Committee. Govt. of India
 Director, Bharat Heavy Electricals Ltd. Govt. of India
 Director, Andhra Bank Limited.
 Director, Bharat Aluminum Co. Ltd. Govt. of India
 Director, Hyderabad Allwyn Metal Works. Govt. of A.P
 Director, A.P Industrial Development Corporation. Govt. of A.P
 Director, M/s Singareni Collieries Co. Ltd. Govt. of A.P
 Director, A.P. Industrial Infrastructure Corporation. Govt. of A.P
 Director, A.P. Non Resident Indian Investment Corporation. Govt. of India
 Director, M/s Southern Transformers & Elec. Ltd. Govt. of A.P
 Director of Gangappa Cables Co. Limited
 Chairman, Lakshmi Porcelains Ltd
 Chairman, Asian Coffee Co. Ltd
 Chairman, Bhasker Palace Hotels  Ltd
 President, Central Board of irrigation and Power (1976–78 and 1979)
 Chairman, National Council of Power Utilities (1982–88) 
 Member, CIGRE Study Committee No. 37 and 31
 Chairman, Amar Raja Power Systems Limited
 Chairman, VBC Ferro Alloys Co. Ltd
 Director, Ultimo Polymers 
 Director, A.P. Paper Mills
 Member, A.P. State Council of Higher Education. Govt. of A.P

Awards and honours
 Padmashri Award from the President of India – 1983
 Andhra Pradesh State Government Award Distinguished Service – April 1981
 Bharat Ratna Sri M. Visveswarayya Award for the year 1985 of insti. Of Engineers and Govt of A.P.
 Om Prakash Bhasin Award of the Year – 1986.
 Golden Jubilee Award of Central Board of Irrigation and Power – 1978
 Scroll of Honour Institute of Engineers -1986
 Honorary Member, Electrical Engineering Association and General Science Association, Sigma Xi (USA)

See also
Dr Narla Tata Rao Thermal Power Station

Notes 

Recipients of the Padma Shri in civil service
1917 births
2007 deaths
People from Krishna district
Engineers from Andhra Pradesh
20th-century Indian engineers
Indian mechanical engineers
Banaras Hindu University alumni
Indian Institute of Technology (BHU) Varanasi alumni